is a song by Japanese rock band Chatmonchy. It was released on November 15, 2006 as the lead single of their second studio album Seimeiryoku. It was used as the ending for the anime Hataraki Man. The song charted at 6th on the Oricon chart, the highest singles chart position the band has achieved to date.

Music video
Three girls wearing yellow raincoats, large glasses, and teal shorts jump on the variously colored rings on the floor at the beginning of the "Shangri-La" music video. As the guitar kicks in the girls start dancing. It then goes into a room where the band is playing, and soon the band is on the floor playing their instruments. The rest of the video switches from different scenes of the band playing and the girls dancing.

Track listing

Charts

Release history

References

Chatmonchy songs
2006 singles
2006 songs
Ki/oon Music singles
Anime songs